Richard Rapáč (born 28 July 1987) is a Slovak former professional ice hockey player.

Career
Rapáč previously played in the Czech Extraliga for HC Bílí Tygři Liberec and HC Litvínov, the Slovak Extraliga for HK Poprad, HC '05 Banská Bystrica and MHk 32 Liptovský Mikuláš and the National League for EV Zug.

He is the older brother of Branislav Rapáč.

Career statistics

Regular season and playoffs

References

External links
 

1987 births
Living people
HC '05 Banská Bystrica players
HC Benátky nad Jizerou players
HC Bílí Tygři Liberec players
MHk 32 Liptovský Mikuláš players
HC Litvínov players
Moose Jaw Warriors players
HC Most players
Prince George Cougars players
Sportspeople from Spišská Nová Ves
HK Poprad players
Slovak ice hockey forwards
HK Spišská Nová Ves players
Stadion Hradec Králové players
HC Vrchlabí players
EV Zug players
Slovak expatriate ice hockey players in Canada
Slovak expatriate ice hockey players in the Czech Republic
Slovak expatriate ice hockey players in Switzerland